The 2016–17 Texas–Arlington Mavericks men's basketball team represented the University of Texas at Arlington during the 2016–17 NCAA Division I men's basketball season. The Mavericks, led by 11th-year head coach Scott Cross, played their home games at the College Park Center as members of the Sun Belt Conference. They finished the season 27–9, 14–4 in Sun Belt play to win the Sun Belt regular season championship. In the Sun Belt tournament, they defeated Coastal Carolina before losing in the semifinals to Texas State. As a regular season conference champions who failed to win their conference tournament, they received an automatic bid to the National Invitation Tournament where they defeated BYU and Akron before losing in the quarterfinals to Cal State Bakersfield.

Previous season
The Mavericks finished the 2015–16 season 24–11, 13–7 in Sun Belt play to finish in third place. They defeated Texas State in the semifinals of the Sun Belt tournament before losing to Louisiana–Monroe. They were invited to the CollegeInsider.com Tournament where they defeated Savannah State in the first round (the Mavericks' first ever post-season tournament win). They received a second-round bye and lost in the quarterfinals to NJIT.

Roster

Schedule and results

|-
!colspan=9 style=| Non-conference regular season

|-
!colspan=9 style=| Sun Belt Conference regular season

|-
!colspan=9 style=| Sun Belt tournament

|-
!colspan=9 style=| NIT

References

UT Arlington Mavericks men's basketball seasons
Texas-Arlington
Texas-Arlington
2016 in sports in Texas
2017 in sports in Texas